The 2020 Red Bull Ring FIA Formula 2 round was a pair of motor races for Formula 2 cars that took place on 4 and 5 July 2020 at the Red Bull Ring in Spielberg, in Austria as part of the FIA Formula 2 Championship. It was the first round of the 2020 FIA Formula 2 Championship and ran in support of the 2020 Austrian Grand Prix.

Classification

Qualifying

Feature Race 

Notes:
 – Luca Ghiotto could not start the race after suffering a mechanical issue on the sighting lap. His grid slot was then left vacant.

Sprint race

Championship standings after the event

Drivers' Championship standings

Teams' Championship standings

 Note: Only the top five positions are included for both sets of standings.

See also 
2020 Austrian Grand Prix
2020 Spielberg Formula 3 round

References

External links 

NOTE:  As a result of the COVID-19 pandemic, Spielberg hosted rounds on consecutive weeks in 2020.

Spielberg
Spielberg
Spielberg Formula 2 round
July 2020 sports events in Austria